Motiș fortified church is a historic Lutheran church in the village of Motiș (also known as Motișdorf, Motișul, Märtesdorf, Mertesdorf, Martonelke) in Valea Viilor Commune, Sibiu County, Transylvania, Romania that was historically home to a large Transylvanian Saxon (German) population.  

Mortesdorf's church castle is a historic, listed-building, which is a late Gothic hall church first mentioned in the records in 1497 just prior to the Protestant Reformation when it became a Lutheran church. The building received a large renovation in 1718 and contains a baroque altar, built in 1791 showing Jesus with John the Apostle and Mary, mother of Jesus and pairs of columns featuring the apostles, Paul the Apostle with the sword of faith, and Saint Peter (with a broken hand), and a top picture represents the Resurrection of Jesus with the Eye of God above it.

References

Lutheran churches in Romania
Lutheran churches converted from Roman Catholicism
Historic monuments in Sibiu County
Gothic architecture in Romania
15th-century churches in Romania